Macrobdellidae is a family of Nearctic leeches belonging to the order Arhynchobdellida.

Genera
The Interim Register of Marine and Non-marine Genera lists:
 Macrobdella Verrill, 1872
 Philobdella Verrill, 1874

References

Annelid families
Leeches